The Brothers Clayton, Clayton Bros. or variation, may refer to:

 The Clayton Brothers, a U.S. jazz band formed by brothers Jeff and John
 Clayton Brothers, U.S. artists brothers Rob and Christian
 "Clayton Bros.", the former name of the beverage Claytons

See also

 Clayton (disambiguation)